Cool Heat, subtitled Anita O'Day Sings Jimmy Giuffre Arrangements, is an album by vocalist Anita O'Day backed by an orchestra arranged and conducted by Jimmy Giuffre which was released on the Verve label in 1959.

Critical reception

Ken Dryden of AllMusic states: "All of O'Day's recordings for Verve in the 1950s are recommended, and this set is no exception".

Track listing
 "Mack the Knife" (Kurt Weill, Bertolt Brecht) – 3:05
 "Easy Come, Easy Go" (Johnny Green, Edward Heyman) – 3:10
 "Orphan Annie" (Public Domain) – 2:00
 "You're a Clown" (Joe Albany, Aileen Albany) – 2:30
 "Gone with the Wind" (Allie Wrubel, Herb Magidson) – 2:24
 "Hooray for Hollywood" (Richard A. Whiting, Johnny Mercer) – 2:21
 "It Had to Be You" (Isham Jones, Gus Kahn) – 3:10
 "Come Rain or Come Shine" (Harold Arlen, Mercer) – 2:13
 "Hershey Bar" (Johnny Mandel) – 2:05
 "A Lover Is Blue" (Charles Carpenter, Jimmy Mundy, Trummy Young) – 2:59
 "My Heart Belongs to Daddy" (Cole Porter) – 2:51
 "The Way You Look Tonight" (Jerome Kern, Dorothy Fields) – 2:09

Personnel
Orchestra arranged and conducted by Jimmy Giuffre including:
Conte Candoli, Tommy Reeves, Jack Sheldon – trumpet
Gil Falco, Lester Robinson, Frank Rosolino – trombone
Bud Shank – alto saxophone, flute
Art Pepper – alto saxophone
Richie Kamuca – tenor saxophone
Jim Hall – guitar
George Morrow – bass
Mel Lewis – drums

References

Anita O'Day albums
Jimmy Giuffre albums
1959 albums
Verve Records albums